Spatulifimbria castaneiceps is a moth of the family Limacodidae first described by George Hampson in 1892. It is found in Sri Lanka, Hong Kong and Taiwan.

Forewings grayish brown. Antennae bipectinate. Caterpillar brownish with yellow and reddish markings. Pupa whitish with brown mottles. Caterpillar is a pest on castor, mango and tea.

Two subspecies are recorded.
Spatulifimbria castaneiceps insolita Hering, 1931
Spatulifimbria castaneiceps opprimata Hering, 1931

References

Moths of Asia
Moths described in 1892
Limacodidae